The 1989–90 Kentucky Wildcats men's basketball team represented University of Kentucky in the 1989–90 NCAA Division I men's basketball season. The head coach was Rick Pitino and the team finished the season with an overall record of 14–14. Coming off the controversy of the Eddie Sutton scandal, the NCAA banned the Kentucky Wildcats from television for one season. The NCAA sanctions placed on the program would also ban any postseason competition for two years and a three-year probational period. Pitino knew this and still took the challenge of making this team successful despite the many deficient parts of the program.

Coming off a decent season in the NBA with the Knicks, Pitino missed the college experience and felt that Kentucky would be the most interesting choice. Pitino was reportedly offered six million dollars for a seven-year contract with Kentucky. Coming into the new season, not all of Kentucky's players were completely committed to playing due to the program being in shambles. Some players were reported to have skipped class or not put forth 100% effort into practices. Ironically, the students that did not compete were focusing more on their grades so they could graduate. Despite Rick Pitino's intense coaching effort, the season included many difficult moments for the Wildcats, including a 150–95 loss to Kansas (which is the largest margin of defeat in Kentucky history). Despite all these obstacles, the Wildcats finished with a respectable  .500 record, and Pitino was named SEC Coach of the Year (for the first of three times) for guiding Kentucky to a 10–8 record in conference and was named the Basketball Times National Coach of the Year in 1990.

1989-90 Roster 

 #4 Derrick Miller 
 #35 Reggie Hanson
 #12 Deron Feldhaus
 #34 John Pelphrey
 #11 Sean Woods
 #14 Jeff Brassow
 #32 Richie Farmer
 #23 Nehemiah Braddy
 #33 Johnathon Davis
 #20 Tony Cooper
 #25 Skip McGaw
 #30 Michael Parks
 #21 Henry Thomas

Personnel
In the wake of the previous season's alleged scandal, Pitino brought in new assistant coaches. One of which was a close friend of his, Ralph Willard. He would leave the New York Knicks to follow Pitino to Kentucky. Tubby Smith left his position as assistant coach at the University of South Carolina to pursue his new career at the University of Kentucky. Herb Sendek was also brought in as an assistant coach. Sendek had previously served as a graduate assistant to Pitino at Providence College. Pitino brought in Billy Donovan as the graduate assistant coach. This would be after a short career on Wall Street and a stint playing in the Continental Basketball Association.

References 

Kentucky Wildcats men's basketball seasons
Kentucky
Kentucky Wildcats
Kentucky Wildcat